The Klebang Beach is a beach in Klebang, Melaka, Malaysia.

Geography
The beach is located in the southern shoreline of Melaka and is facing directly to the Strait of Malacca at the end of Klebang Peninsula. The beach is located next to the 1Malaysia Square.

See also
 Geography of Malaysia
 List of tourist attractions in Melaka

References

Beaches of Melaka
Central Melaka District